Shaw Farm is on the royal estate at Windsor. Originally a home farm for Windsor Castle, by the early 19th century it came into the ownership of Princess Augusta Sophia. Upon her death in 1840, it was purchased by the Crown Estate. In 1851, the tenant farmer was evicted and the tenancy taken over by Albert, Prince Consort. Albert ran it as a model farm and constructed a number of buildings, including a new farmhouse and workers' dwellings. Albert raised a variety of livestock including prize-winning Clydesdale horses. Following Albert's death, the farm was used to house exotic livestock given to Queen Victoria.

Early history 
The farm has its origins as a home farm for the supply of produce to the nearby Windsor Castle. By the early 19th century, it was owned by Princess Augusta Sophia and tenanted to the Voules family. It was extended in 1817 during the enclosure of Windsor and in the early part of Queen Victoria's reign, with the demolition of labourer's dwellings, formerly a hospital granted to the Crown by the Windsor Corporation in 1784. In September 1840, the farm was purchased by the Crown Estate, upon the death of Augusta.

The land was let by the Crown to a Mr Watkins and, after his death in 1845, to his son-in-law Charles Cantrell. Further land had been added to the farm in 1843 with the Crown's purchase of the Keppel estate to the south and east.

Albert's model farm 
Victoria's husband Prince Albert had managed the nearby Home Farm since 1841 and looked to expand his land, which was used as a model farm. In February 1851, Cantrell was advised that his tenancy would be ended in favour of one to Albert. Cantrell unsuccessfully petitioned for compensation. The decision may also have been made as the construction of Albert Road around this time divided the Shaw Farm lands and may have affected its viability to a commercial tenant. Albert's annual rent to the Crown Estate was almost £250.

Albert constructed a number of new buildings on the site before his death in 1861. These were half-funded by Albert and half by the Crown Estate. Albert showed concern for the welfare of his workers and an eight-roomed house with tower was constructed north of the main farm buildings for their lodgings. Two labourer's cottages were built on Albert Road from 1852, at a cost of £450, and a new farmhouse during 1853-54 at a cost of £5,691. The farm was regarded as well-equipped by early-Victorian standards with stables, cattle boxes, stalls, poultry house, piggeries, a covered sheep shed and manure tank. 

Albert delegated the general running of the farm to Lieutenant-General William Wemyss (died 1852) and then to his stewards, Mr Wilson and then Mr Tait. Albert introduced a short-horned dairy cattle herd in 1853. He also bred Clydesdale horses with which he won Royal Agricultural Society of England prizes, Berkshire pigs and Cheviot sheep.

Victorian era 
The farm was worked by six pairs of plough horses and employed thirty men full time, with more on a seasonal basis. A painting of the farm in this period is held by the Royal Collection Trust.

The farm was used to house a number of exotic livestock gifted to the queen. This included Zebu cattle presented by the Maharajah of Mysore in 1862, Zulu cattle from Garnet Wolseley, 1st Viscount Wolseley, in 1880, wild boar sent from Sandringham by Edward, Prince of Wales, and a kangaroo. The farmhouse contained a suite of rooms for Victoria from which she could directly enter the poultry department.

Recent history 
The site remains an active farm. During the state funeral of Elizabeth II on 19 September 2022, the procession to Windsor Castle began from the Shaw Farm gate on Albert Road, where it was joined by the state hearse carrying the Queen's coffin from London.

References

Further reading 

Windsor Great Park
Farms in England
Albert, Prince Consort